Lists of political parties include:

 List of agrarian parties
 List of banned political parties
 List of centrist political parties
 List of communitarian political parties
 List of fictional political parties
 List of frivolous political parties
 List of generic names of political parties
 List of Labour parties
 List of largest political parties
 List of left-wing political parties
 List of political parties by region
 List of right-wing political parties
 List of ruling political parties by country
 List of syncretic political parties
 Political lists#Political parties by country

See also
List of political ideologies
List of populists
 :Category:Political party disambiguation pages